Joanne Fitzgerald was a Canadian artist, illustrator and writer. Twice-shortlisted for the Canadian Governor General's Award for Children's Illustration, her book Dr. Kiss Says Yes won the award in 1991.

Early life and education
Fitzgerald was born in Montreal, Quebec, showing promise as an artist from an early age. She studied fine art at Mount Allison University, graduating with a Baccalaureate in Fine Arts in 1977.

Career
Early in her career, Fitzgerald was a staff illustrator at the Royal Ontario Museum. Her subsequent work as a magazine illustrator brought her a following among children's magazine publishers, and drew her into children's textbook illustrations.  In turn, she began to illustrate and then write children's books.

Later in life, she returned to fine art, studying and painting at the Art Students League of New York.  She was also  an early organizer of the Lymphedema Association of Ontario, and served as president and spokesperson in establishing the organization in 2002–2004.

Works

Illustrated children's books

Plain Noodles (also published as Baby Boat) (1989); story by Betty Waterton
Emily's House (1990); story by Niko Scharer
Doctor Kiss Says Yes (1991; re-issued 2012); story by Teddy Jam  Matt Cohen
Ten Small Tales (1993); story by Celia Lotteridge
Jacob's Best Sisters (1996); story by Teddy Jam a.k.a. Matt Cohen
The Little Rooster and the Diamond Button (2001); story by Celia Barker Lotteridge
When You Get A Baby (2002); story by Sharon Jennings
Circus Play (2002); story by Anne Laurel Carter
This is Me and Where I Am (2004); story by Joanne Fitzgerald
The Blue Hippopotamus (2007); story by Phoebe Gilman
Yum! Yum! (2008); story by Joanne Fitzgerald

Awards and recognition

 Dr. Kiss Says Yes (1991) – Governor General's Award for English Language Children's Illustration
 Ten Small Tales (1993) – IODE Jean Throop Award
 The Little Rooster and the Diamond Button (2001) – Mr. Christie's Book Awards Diamond Pin
 The Blue Hippopotamus (2007) – Finalist: Governor General's Award for English Language Children's Illustration

Joanne Fitzgerald Illustrator in Residence Award and Program

The Joanne Fitzgerald Illustrator in Residence Program was established in 2013 to honour Joanne Fitzgerald and her contributions to children's literature. The award and program are a joint project of the Canadian chapter of the International Board on Books for Young People (IBBY Canada), the Canadian Urban Libraries Council and participating libraries which have included the Toronto Public Library and the Edmonton Public Library.

The program awards a jury-selected, published Canadian children's book illustrator with a residency at a Canadian urban library each October. The winning Illustrator in Residence leads a program which explains and promotes children's book illustration. Activities include art activities for classes of children, presentations for adults, presentations at nearby high schools and colleges, portfolio reviews for aspiring illustrators, interviews with the press and the display of the illustrator's work in the library. Past winners join experts from the participating library and IBBY Canada as jurists for the following year.

Due to the global COVID-19 pandemic, the 2020 program was cancelled, with no winner chosen. Returning in 2021, the program now leverages emergent technology to provide an online, interactive experience between the illustrator and the adult and children audiences, extending the program's geographic availability.

Winners

References

External links 

 Joanne Fitzgerald at Library of Congress Authorities, with 5 catalogue records
IBBY Program Description
Canadian Urban Libraries Council

1956 births
2011 deaths
Art Students League of New York alumni
Artists from Montreal
Canadian children's book illustrators
Governor General's Award-winning children's illustrators
Mount Allison University alumni
Writers from Montreal